José Carlos Gonçalves Abreu (born 14 November 1954 in Guimarães) is a former Portuguese footballer, who played as midfielder.

Abreu gained 3 caps for the Portugal national team.

External links 
 
 

1954 births
Living people
Sportspeople from Guimarães
Vitória S.C. players
Portimonense S.C. players
G.D. Chaves players
Portugal international footballers
Portuguese footballers
Primeira Liga players
Association football midfielders